The Hundred of Ross, is a hundred in the County of Robe in the Limestone Coast region of South Australia.

References

Limestone Coast
Ross